The following is a list of drivers who are currently competing in a series sanctioned by the National Association for Stock Car Auto Racing (NASCAR).

NASCAR Cup Series drivers
All statistics used in these tables are as of the end of the 2022 Bank of America Roval 400. (Race 32/36)

Full-time drivers
Drivers who will compete in all 2022 NASCAR Cup Series races.

Part-time drivers
Drivers who will compete in at least one 2022 NASCAR Cup Series race.

Free agents
Drivers currently without a ride, but who competed for 2021 NASCAR Cup Series championship points.

NASCAR Xfinity Series drivers
All statistics used in these tables are as of the end of the 2022 NASCAR Xfinity Series at Charlotte (fall race) (Race 29/33)

Full-time drivers
Drivers who will compete in all 2022 NASCAR Xfinity Series races.

Part-time drivers
Drivers who will compete in at least one 2022 NASCAR Xfinity Series race.

Free agents
Drivers currently without a ride, but who competed for 2021 NASCAR Xfinity Series championship points.

NASCAR Camping World Truck Series drivers
All statistics used in these tables are as of the end of the 2022 Chevrolet Silverado 250 (Race 21/23)

Full-time drivers
Drivers who will compete in all 2022 NASCAR Camping World Truck Series races.

Part-time drivers
Drivers who will compete in at least one 2022 NASCAR Camping World Truck Series race.

Free agents
Drivers currently without a ride, but who competed for 2019 NASCAR Gander Outdoors Truck Series championship points.

ARCA Menards Racing Series drivers
All statistics used in these tables are as of the end of the 2022 General Tire Delivers 200 (Race 10/20)

Full-time drivers
Drivers who will compete in all 2022 ARCA Menards Series races.

Part-time drivers
Drivers who will compete in at least one 2022 ARCA Menards Series race.

ARCA Menards Series East drivers
All statistics used in these tables are as of the end of the 2020 Skip's Western Outfitters 175 (Race 1/8)

Full-time drivers
Drivers who will compete in all 2020 ARCA Menards Series East races.

Part-time drivers
Drivers who will compete in at least one 2020 ARCA Menards Series East race.

ARCA Menards Series West drivers
All statistics used in these tables are as of the end of the 2019 Eneos NAPA Auto 150 (Race 2/14)

Full-time drivers
Drivers who will compete in all 2019 NASCAR K&N Pro Series West races.

Part-time drivers
Drivers who will compete in at least one 2019 NASCAR K&N Pro Series West race.

NASCAR Whelen Modified Tour drivers
All statistics used in these tables are as of the end of the 2019 Icebreaker 150 (Race 3/16)

Full-time drivers

Part-time drivers

NASCAR Pinty’s Series drivers
All statistics used in these tables are as of the end of the 2020 shortened season and only include active drivers during the year.

Full-time drivers

Part-time drivers

NASCAR PEAK Mexico Series drivers

All statistics used in these tables are as of the end of the 2015 RedCo 240 (Race 15/15)

Full-time drivers

Part-time drivers

NASCAR Whelen Euro Series – EuroNASCAR PRO Division drivers
All statistics used in these tables are as of the end of the 2021 NASCAR GP Italy (Race 12/12). Records earned from 2009–2011 when the series was still called Racecar Euro Series (before NASCAR's acquisition of the series in 2012) will not be included to the statistics.

Full-time drivers
Drivers who are entered in all 2021 NASCAR Whelen Euro Series races.

Part-time drivers
Drivers who competed in at least one 2021 NASCAR Whelen Euro Series race.

NASCAR Whelen Euro Series – EuroNASCAR 2 Division drivers
All statistics used in these tables are as of the end of the 2020 NASCAR GP Belgium (Race 4/10). Records earned from 2009–2011 when the series was still called Racecar Euro Series (before NASCAR's acquisition of the series in 2012) will not be included to the statistics.

Full-time drivers
Drivers who are scheduled to compete in all 2020 NASCAR Whelen Euro Series races.

Part-time drivers
Drivers who competed in at least one 2020 NASCAR Whelen Euro Series race.

See also
 List of NASCAR teams
 List of female NASCAR drivers
 List of Canadians in NASCAR
 List of Hispanic NASCAR drivers
 List of foreign-born NASCAR race winners
 List of NASCAR champions
 List of all-time NASCAR Cup Series winners
 NASCAR's 50 Greatest Drivers
 Owner-driver (NASCAR)

External links
NASCAR.com
NASCAR Home Tracks website
Racing-Reference.info

 
NASCAR drivers